This is a list of Safavid governors (walis) of Baghdad, ruling over Iraq.

 Looe looe Hussain (1508–1515)
 Fanharez (1515–1524)
 Mohamed Khan Bin Sharafaldeen (1529–1533)
 Tekkelu Muhammad Sultan Khan (1533–1534)
 Safyaldeen Qaly Khan (1623–1631)
 Bektash Khan Mirimanidze (1631–1638)
 Yaftash Khan (1641–1638)

See also
 List of Ottoman governors of Baghdad

References 

Safavid governors of Baghdad
Government of Baghdad